Stuart Jamieson Fuller (May 4, 1880 – 1941) was the Vice Consul in Hong Kong from 1906 to 1910; Vice Consul in Naples from 1910 to 1911. he was the United States Consul in Gothenburg from 1911 to 1912 and United States Consul to Iquitos, 1912 to 1913 and  Durban in 1913. He was the United States Consul General in Tientsin from 1919 to 1923. He was a member of Phi Beta Kappa and Delta Tau Delta.

References

1880 births
1941 deaths
20th-century American diplomats
American expatriates in British Hong Kong
American expatriates in Italy
American expatriates in Sweden
American expatriates in Peru
American expatriates in South Africa
American expatriates in China